The Palmerston by-election of 1918 was a by-election held in the  electorate during the 19th New Zealand Parliament, on 19 December 1918. The by-election was won by the sitting Mayor of Palmerston North, Jimmy Nash with a majority of 315.

Background
The contest was triggered by the death of incumbent MP David Buick of the Reform Party on 18 November 1918 during the influenza epidemic. Under the terms of the coalition agreement between Reform and the Liberal's a condition was made not to oppose each other in by-elections for deceased or retiring MP's from their own parties. However, both contested the seat after failing to agree on a joint National Government nominee.

Results
The following table gives the election results:

Notes

References

Palm
1918 elections in New Zealand
Politics of Manawatū-Whanganui